Mark Janoschak (born December 2, 1968, in Bramalea, a community in Chinguacousy Township) is a Canadian ice dancer. With partner Jacqueline Petr, he is the 1992 Canadian national champion. They represented Canada at the 1992 Winter Olympics, where they placed 12th.

Career
A few months after he and Jacqueline Petr teamed up, they placed 7th at the 1987 World Junior Championships.

Two years later, Petr and Janoschak placed 6th at the Canadian Championships. The following year, they won the bronze medal. In 1991, they won the silver medal and qualified for the 1991 World Championships, where they placed 10th.

In 1992, Petr and Janoschak won their national title and were selected for the 1992 Winter Olympics. During a practice session on February 10, Petr's right skate hit her left calf, requiring 22 stitches. They finished 12th at the Olympics. At the 1992 World Championships, they placed 12th.

Petr and Janoschak retired from competitive skating and skated professionally in shows. Janoschak also skated competitively with Sandra Ross under the direction of Roy Bradshaw.

Results
(with Jacqueline Petr)

References

External links 
 
 

1968 births
Living people
Figure skaters at the 1992 Winter Olympics
Canadian male ice dancers
Olympic figure skaters of Canada
Sportspeople from Brampton
Competitors at the 1990 Goodwill Games
20th-century Canadian people